Chicken wire, or poultry netting, is a mesh of wire commonly used to fence in fowl, such as chickens, in a run or coop. It is made of thin, flexible, galvanized steel wire with hexagonal gaps. Available in 1 inch (about 2.5 cm) diameter, 2 inch (about 5 cm) and 1/2 inch (about 1.3 cm), chicken wire is available in various gauges--usually 19 gauge (about 1 mm wire) to 22 gauge (about 0.7 mm wire). Chicken wire is occasionally used to build inexpensive pens for small animals (or to protect plants and property from animals) though the thinness and zinc content of galvanized wire may be inappropriate for animals prone to gnawing and will not keep out predators.

In construction, chicken wire or hardware cloth is used as a metal lath to hold cement or plaster, a process known as stuccoing. Concrete reinforced with chicken wire or hardware cloth yields ferrocement, a versatile construction material. It can also be used to make the armature for a papier-mâché sculpture, when relatively high strength is needed.

History

Charles Barnard, a British ironmonger, built the world's first wire-netting machine in 1844. He based his design on cloth weaving machines. Soon the firm of Barnard, Bishop & Barnard, established in Norwich, was selling wire netting all over the world. 

During World War II, the fine wire used to make chicken wire was used to make large wire ground mats for radar systems, evening out the random reflections from the uneven ground below. The installation of these systems caused a countrywide shortage of chicken wire in the United Kingdom.

During World war II it was also commonly put on helmets by German soldiers to cover the helmet and camouflage it with plants and branches.

Other uses 

In chemistry, molecules with fused carbon rings are often compared to chicken wire — see chicken wire (chemistry).

In photonics, the chicken-wire effect is a predominant pattern of low transmission lines between multifiber bundles in a fiberoptic used to couple the intensifier tube to the CCD sensor. The lines have a pattern similar to that of chicken wire.

In machine tool design, chicken wire may be used for safety guarding.

Chicken wire commonly used in construction has been found to block or attenuate Wi-Fi, cellular and other radio frequency transmissions by inadvertently creating a Faraday cage.

See also 

 Chain-link fencing
 Oligodendroglioma, a brain tumor with a microscopic chicken wire capillary pattern

References

External links 

 Wire gauges (SWG) used in Chicken Wire
  - a machine that makes chicken wire.
 Higher quality video of a Gabion machine

Fences
Wire